= East London Genes & Health =

British genomic research study

East London Genes & Health is a genomic research study of 100,000 people of Bangladeshi and Pakistani origin. These ethnic groups have a rate of diabetes five times higher than the rest of the population. The project is managed by Queen Mary University of London.

Professor David van Heel and Dr Sarah Finer are working on one of the world’s largest community-based genetics studies to fully sequence the genomes of 100,000 people of South Asian descent.

Genome-wide association studies have been largely limited to European ancestry populations. A study of 22,490 people from this project with linked electronic health record data found evidence for transferability for the majority of cardiometabolic loci powered to replicate. This is the first comprehensive assessment of the transferability of cardiometabolic loci to a non-European ancestry population.
